The anterior tibial artery is an artery of the leg. It carries blood to the anterior compartment of the leg and dorsal surface of the foot, from the popliteal artery.

Structure

Course
The anterior tibial artery is a branch of the popliteal artery. It originates at the distal end of the popliteus muscle posterior to the tibia. The artery typically passes anterior to the popliteus muscle prior to passing between the tibia and fibula through an oval opening at the superior aspect of the interosseus membrane. The artery then descends between the tibialis anterior and extensor digitorum longus muscles.

It is accompanied by the anterior tibial vein, and the deep peroneal nerve, along its course.

It crosses the anterior aspect of the ankle joint, at which point it becomes the dorsalis pedis artery.

Branches
The branches of the anterior tibial artery are:
posterior tibial recurrent artery
anterior tibial recurrent artery
muscular branches
anterior medial malleolar artery
anterior lateral malleolar artery
dorsalis pedis artery

Clinical significance
As the artery passes medial to the fibular neck, it becomes vulnerable to damage during a tibial osteotomy.

Additional images

Reference

External links
  - "Arteries of the lower extremity shown in association with major landmarks."
 http://www.dartmouth.edu/~humananatomy/figures/chapter_15/15-10.HTM 
 http://www.dartmouth.edu/~humananatomy/figures/chapter_17/17-3.HTM 

Arteries of the lower limb